Bruce Rock is a town in the eastern Wheatbelt region of Western Australia, approximately  east of Perth and  southwest of Merredin. It is the main town in the Shire of Bruce Rock.

History

Originally known as Nunagin or Noonegin, the name of the town led to confusion between other towns such as Narrogin and Nungarin. The name was changed to Bruce Rock after the large granite feature located close to the town. The townsite was gazetted in 1913.

The rock was named after sandalwood cutter, John Rufus Bruce, who worked in the area in 1879.

The heritage listed shire office building was opened in January 1929.

The painter John Perceval was born in Bruce Rock in 1923.

In 1932 the Wheat Pool of Western Australia announced that the town would have two grain elevators, each fitted with an engine, installed at the railway siding.

The town won the tidy town award for the wheatbelt in 2003 following a push to rejuvenate older buildings, installing landscaping and the completion of an amphitheatre. A waste transfer station was also upgraded.

Economy

Economically the area depends on cropping of cereals, primarily wheat, but also barley, lupins and peas. Livestock such as sheep, goats and pigs are also raised in the area. The town is a receival site for Cooperative Bulk Handling.

See also
Wheatbelt railway lines of Western Australia

References

External links

Towns in Western Australia
Grain receival points of Western Australia
Shire of Bruce Rock